The Miss Nebraska USA competition is the pageant that selects the representative for the state Nebraska in the Miss USA pageant. The pageant is directed by Vanbros & Associates, headquartered in Lenexa, Kansas. In 2002, Nebraska joined the Vanbros group of state pageants for the Miss USA and Teen USA system.

Nebraska is one of the least successful states at Miss USA, having only placed 14 times. They were most successful in the 1950s, placing 6 times, with three runner up placements. Until 2018, their highest placement was in 1955 which was 2nd runner up. Belinda Wright's top 15 placement in 2010 was Nebraska's first semi-final placement since 1980 and first to win Miss Congeniality. In 2018, Sarah Rose Summers became the first Miss Nebraska USA to win Miss USA and becoming the 35th state to have the title of Miss USA for the first time. The most recent placement was Natalie Pieper placing 2nd runner-up in 2022.

In 2020, Megan Swanson became the first Miss Nebraska delegate to ever win the state title. Also, she and her sister Allie Swanson, Miss Nebraska 2019, became the first sisters to hold the statewide Miss USA and Miss America titleholders simultaneously.

Natalie Pieper of Lincoln was crowned Miss Nebraska USA 2022 on March 6, 2022 at Rose Blumkin Performing Arts Center in Omaha. She represented Nebraska for the title of Miss USA 2022, finished as 2nd runner-up.

Gallery

Results summary

Placements
Miss USA: Sarah Rose Summers (2018) 
2nd runners-up: Donna Jo Streever (1955), Natalie Pieper (2022)
3rd runners-up: Shari Lewis (1956), Carolyn McGirr (1957)
Top 12: Janice Geiler (1973), Rebecca Staab (1980)
Top 15/16/19/20: Berneta Nelson (1953), Margie Winkhoff (1954), Dee Kjeldgaard (1958), Gail Weinstock (1961), Belinda Wright (2010), Amanda Soltero (2014), Erika Etzelmiller (2021)
 
Nebraska holds a record of 14 placements at Miss USA.

Awards
Miss Photogenic: Janice Geiler (1973)
Honorable Mention: Stacey Skidmore (2002)
Miss Congeniality: Belinda Wright (2010)

Winners 

Color key

References

External links
 Official Website

 
Nebraska
Organizations based in Nebraska
Nebraska culture
Recurring events established in 1952
1952 establishments in Nebraska
Annual events in Nebraska